Saint Laurence's Gate is a barbican which was built in the 13th century as part of the walled fortifications of the medieval town of Drogheda in Ireland. It is a barbican or defended fore-work which stood directly outside the original gate of which no surface trace survives. It has been described as one of the finest of its kind, and is designated as a national monument. The original names for Laurence Street and Saint Laurence Gate were Great East Street and Great East Gate, respectively. In the 14th century, the street and gate were renamed because they led to the hospital of Saint Laurence, which stood close to the Cord church.

Structure
The structure consists of two towers, each with four floors, joined by a bridge at the top, and an entrance arch at street level. Entry is gained up a flight of stairs in the south tower. There is a slot underneath the arch from where a portcullis originally could be raised and lowered.

Historians have wondered why such a large barbican was built in the east of the town, when the main artery through the town has always been north/south. For comparison, a similar barbican in Canterbury is less than half the height of Saint Laurence Gate.  However, from the top of the Gate, the estuary of the Boyne and a four-mile stretch of river from there to Drogheda can be observed.  This is therefore the only point in the town with a clear view of a potential sea invasion. The earliest pictures of Laurence's Gate show that there was a raised lookout platform at the top of the south tower to provide an even higher vantage point.

A portion of the town wall remains to the south of Saint Laurence's Gate.  North of Laurence's Gate, the wall ran up Palace St/King St where the footpath is today. The depth of the basements of the houses and the Centre for Continuing Education on King Street suggest the presence of a deep trench outside the wall. Over the centuries, as the walls and gates fell into disrepair, the rubble stones were reused in later buildings.  For example, the house and walls at the corner of Laurence Street and Palace Street and stone walls in Francis Street.  Older pictures show that a toll booth and gate house remained until the early 19th century. The shop beside Laurence's Gate was a bicycle shop in the early 1900s.  The green letter box dates from a time when there was a post office there.

Events
Music at the Gate is held during the warmer months of the year. A variety of performances are hosted by the nonprofit Music at the Gate organisers.

Gallery

References

Barbicans
Buildings and structures in Drogheda
National Monuments in County Louth